Andecovirus is a subgenus of viruses in the genus Deltacoronavirus, consisting of a single species, Wigeon coronavirus HKU20.

References

Virus subgenera
Deltacoronaviruses